Gekko sorok is a species of gecko. It is endemic to  Sabah in Borneo.

References

Gekko
Reptiles described in 2008
Reptiles of Malaysia
Endemic fauna of Borneo
Endemic fauna of Malaysia
Reptiles of Borneo